Agave guiengola, common name "Creme Brulee Agave",  is an evergreen plant belonging to the family Asparagaceae. This species is endemic to the State of Oaxaca, Mexico. It is associated with cacti and succulents. The species name guiengola refers to the Cerro Guiengola, the mountain where the species was first discovered.

Description
The dark brown margins of the leaves are densely toothed. The flowering period extends from February to March.

References

External links
 EoL
 Huntington.org
 Palmaris.org
 On line Plant Guide

guiengola
Flora of Oaxaca